Ida Christina Drougge, (born 15 August 1990) is a Swedish politician for the Moderate Party. She has been a member of the Riksdag for Stockholm since 2014. She has also worked as a production manager and filmproducer for Martin Borgs. She has also worked at the Lidingö Municipality, at the City council.

References

External links 

Living people
Women members of the Riksdag
1990 births
Members of the Riksdag from the Moderate Party
Swedish people of Belgian descent
Members of the Riksdag 2014–2018
Members of the Riksdag 2018–2022
Members of the Riksdag 2022–2026
21st-century Swedish women politicians